Keith Morgan (born November 12, 1973 in Calgary, Alberta) is a retired judoka from Canada, who competed in four consecutive Summer Olympics, and won four medals at the Pan American Games.

Sporting career
Morgan represented his native country at four consecutive Summer Olympics, starting in 1996 in Atlanta, Georgia. He was affiliated with the Club de Judo Shikodan in Montreal. He is the twin brother of Colin Morgan, who competed as a judoka at the 1996 Summer Olympics.

Morgan was inducted into Judo Canada's Hall of Fame in 2013. Keith is also a sponsored athlete of Healy Ford.

See also
 Judo in Alberta
Judo in Canada
List of Canadian judoka

References

External links
 

1973 births
Living people
Canadian male judoka
Canadian twins
Judoka at the 1996 Summer Olympics
Judoka at the 2000 Summer Olympics
Judoka at the 2004 Summer Olympics
Judoka at the 2008 Summer Olympics
Judoka at the 1995 Pan American Games
Judoka at the 1999 Pan American Games
Judoka at the 2003 Pan American Games
Olympic judoka of Canada
Sportspeople from Calgary
Twin sportspeople
Pan American Games gold medalists for Canada
Pan American Games silver medalists for Canada
Pan American Games bronze medalists for Canada
Commonwealth Games medallists in judo
Commonwealth Games silver medallists for Canada
Pan American Games medalists in judo
Universiade medalists in judo
Judoka at the 2002 Commonwealth Games
Universiade gold medalists for Canada
Medalists at the 1999 Summer Universiade
Medalists at the 1995 Pan American Games
Medalists at the 1999 Pan American Games
Medalists at the 2003 Pan American Games
20th-century Canadian people
21st-century Canadian people
Medallists at the 2002 Commonwealth Games